The Exkluziv Joker is a Slovakian ultralight trike that was designed by Jindrich Zahumensky and produced by Exkluziv sro of Topoľčany. The aircraft is supplied as a complete ready-to-fly-aircraft.

Design and development
Zahumensky intended the Joker as a clean-sheet attempt to rethink how ultralight trikes are designed, including styling and pilot seating. It features a strut-braced hang glider-style high-wing with electric trim, weight-shift controls, a two-seats-in-tandem open cockpit with a non-structural fibreglass cockpit fairing, tricycle landing gear with wheel pants and a single engine in pusher configuration.

The aircraft is made from bolted-together aluminum tubing, with its double surface wing covered in Dacron sailcloth. The powerplant is a four-cylinder, air and liquid-cooled, four-stroke, dual-ignition  Rotax 912S engine or a twin cylinder, air-cooled, two-stroke, dual-ignition  Hirth 2703 engine.

A number of different strut-braced wings can be fitted to the basic carriage, including the Bautek Pico S and the Aeros Profi TL.

Specifications (Joker with Bautek Pico S wing)

References

External links

2000s Slovak sport aircraft
2000s Slovak ultralight aircraft
Single-engined pusher aircraft
Ultralight trikes